This is a list of episodes of the tenth season of The Ellen DeGeneres Show, which aired from September 2012 to June 2013.

Episodes

References

External links
 

10
2012 American television seasons
2013 American television seasons